Peter Charles Trend (born 24 August 1974) is a former English cricketer.  Trend was a right-handed batsman who fielded as a wicket-keeper.  He was born in Wolverhampton, Staffordshire.

Trend made his debut for Lincolnshire in the 1997 MCCA Knockout Trophy against Hertfordshire.  Trend played Minor counties cricket for Lincolnshire from 1997 to 2000, which included 32 Minor Counties Championship matches and 16 MCCA Knockout Trophy matches.  He made his List A debut against Derbyshire in the 1997 NatWest Trophy.  He played 4 further List A matches for Lincolnshire, the last coming against Lancashire in the 2000 NatWest Trophy.  In his 5 matches, he scored 94 runs at an average of 18.00, while behind the stumps he took 5 catches and made a single stumping.  He scored his only half century when he made 53 against the Netherlands in the 2000 NatWest Trophy.

References

External links
Peter Trend at ESPNcricinfo
Peter Trend at CricketArchive

1974 births
Living people
Cricketers from Wolverhampton
English cricketers
Lincolnshire cricketers
Wicket-keepers